Jennie Jacques is an English actress. She is known for her roles in the BBC Two drama Desperate Romantics (2009), the police procedural WPC 56 (2013–2014), and the History Channel series Vikings (2015–2019).

Early life
Jacques was born in Walsgrave Hospital and grew up in Coventry, Leamington Spa, and Warwick. She is the eldest of seven children.

Career
Jacques made her television debut as Katie Fielding in an episode of the ITV police series The Bill. Her first major was as artists' model Annie Miller in the six-part BBC Two period drama Desperate Romantics (2009) about the Pre-Raphaelite Brotherhood. Jacques made her feature film debut as Beth in the urban thriller Cherry Tree Lane and Ree Ree in the futuristic thriller Shank. Jacques has also appeared in Casualty on BBC1, where she played Lily Knowles, the carer of Megan Roach, in the episode "Nice and Easy Does It" broadcast on 7 August 2010.

In 2011, Jacques was featured in the promotional video for the Mason single Boadicea. She also appeared in slasher film Demons Never Die (2011), in which she appeared nude during a sex scene with Robert Sheehan. Jacques appeared in an episode of Father Brown in 2013, and was then cast as the lead actress in the BBC afternoon series WPC 56, about a woman police constable in the male-dominated world of 1956. Both programmes were made by BBC Birmingham.

Jacques portrays Judith, the fictional daughter of King Aelle, in the third through the fifth seasons of Vikings (2014–2019). In 2015, she played the role of Tash in the ITV sitcom The Delivery Man (2015), which aired for six episodes. In 2019, Jacques starred in the first series of the drama series London Kills, playing a homeless witness named Amber Saunders.

Personal life
Jacques is an ambassador for the Open Medicine Foundation. In a 2021 interview with The Sunday Times, she opened up about the ME/CFS and post-exertional malaise she developed after coming down with a severe bout of Epstein–Barr virus in early 2019. She had to put her career "on hold" as her condition affected her mobility. She has also been an advocate for those living with epilepsy as inspired by her sister.

In 2021, Jacques was engaged.

Filmography

References

External links

Living people
1989 births
21st-century English actresses
Actresses from Coventry
English film actresses
English health activists
English television actresses
People with chronic fatigue syndrome
ME/CFS activists